Bede Vincent Heather (7 December 1928 – 25 February 2021) was an Australian Roman Catholic bishop.

Heather was born in Australia and was ordained to the priesthood in 1951. He served as titular bishop of Obbi and as auxiliary bishop of the Roman Catholic Archdiocese of Sydney, Australia, from 1979 to 1986 and as bishop of the Roman Catholic Diocese of Parramatta from 1986 to 1997.

Notes

1928 births
2021 deaths
20th-century Roman Catholic bishops in Australia
Roman Catholic bishops of Parramatta
Roman Catholic bishops of Sydney